Maite Hontelé is a Dutch trumpeter specializing in Latin and jazz trumpet. She is the granddaughter of André Hontelé (1922-2005); musician, composer and author of books on school music. 
. 
She got in touch with salsa through her father's record collection.

At the age of 9 Hontelé learned to play the trumpet in the harmony orchestra of the village Haaften. After graduary school in Gorinchem doing exam including music,
she studied at the  Rotterdam Conservatory of Music.

From about 1995 onwards Hontelé played in various salsa bands. In 2008 she performed in Colombia with the Cubop City Big Band during the jazz festival of Medellín;
afterwards she decided to move to Colombia. Hontelé lived there for over a decade and formed her own band; between 2010 and 2013 she toured Europe with Dutch musicians.

Hontelé cooperated with other artists, such as in 2013 with the Panamese singer-activist Rubén Blades a tour through a number of countries such as France, Suriname and India.
In 2013 she performed together with the rapper Typhoon on the Oerol Festival.

In 2014 Hontelé toured the Netherlands for the first time with her renewed Colombian band. Her album Déjame Asi - with as guests singer Oscar D'Léon and the duo Ten Sharp - was nominated for a Latin Grammy Award.

After the album Te Voy A Querer in 2016 a coöperation followed with the Venezuelan jazztrumpettiste/singer Linda Briceño.

At the end of 2018 the album Cuba Linda was issued including guest-appearances by singer Gilberto Santa Rosa and Orquesta Aragon. This album too was nominated for a Latin Grammy.

As of 2019, she has ended her musical career and lives in the Netherlands again after almost a decade in Colombia.

Albums 
 2009 - Llegó La Mona
 2010 - Mujer Sonora
 2013 - Déjame Así
 2015 - Te Voy A Querer
 2018 - Cuba Linda

References

External links
Facebook page
Maites website, (now defunct) by web.archive

1980 births
Living people
Dutch trumpeters
Salsa musicians
Musicians from Utrecht (city)
People from Neerijnen
21st-century trumpeters
Codarts University for the Arts alumni